The erythromycin breath test (ERMBT) is a method used to measure metabolism (oxidation and elimination from the system) by a part of the cytochrome P450 system. Erythromycin produces 14CO2, and this 14CO2  can be measured to study drugs that interact with the cytochrome P450 system.  Erythromycin is tagged with carbon-14 and given as an intravenous injection; after 20 minutes the subject blows up a balloon and the carbon dioxide exhaled that is tagged with carbon-14 shows the activity of the CYP3A4 isoenzyme on the erythromycin. ERMBT can be used to determine how drugs that the CYP3A4 isoenzyme metabolizes will function in a given individual.

Erythromycin is a drug that treats bacterial infections like bronchitis, sexually transmitted diseases, and pneumonia. The medication is in a capsule form and takes on a "delayed-release," to ensure it is only broken down once it reaches the intestine and not by stomach acids.

The test allows doctors to determine or predict an individual’s drug treatment outcome. Will a patient develop serious or fatal side effects from a certain drug? Which foods and drugs should not be taken together? With this and other tests a physician may determine treatment outcomes in advance or study the effects of new drugs.

Some patients have a congenital inability to synthesize certain enzymes, so drugs may build up to toxic levels in their system or other drugs and foods a patient is taking may consume all of their ability to metabolize certain foods and drugs. An example is: when a person taking a cholesterol-lowering statin drug then drinking grapefruit juice, they may have a poor treatment outcome (adverse drug reaction) and sustain liver damage or kidney failure due to drug induced rhabdomyolysis (the breaking up of muscle tissue).

References 

Enzymes
Breath tests